Narasimhan is a surname. Notable people with the surname include:

 Laxman Narasimhan, Indian businessman, CEO of Reckitt Benckiser
 Mudumbai Seshachalu Narasimhan (1932–2021), Indian mathematician
 Raghavan Narasimhan (1937–2015), Indian mathematician at the University of Chicago
 Vasant Narasimhan, CEO of Novartis